FC Spartak Sofia was a Bulgarian football club based in Sofia, Bulgaria. The club was officially founded in 1947.  The team plays in the Bulgarian Regional Division.  The club's home colours are blue and white. Spartak's home ground is Rakovski Stadium with a capacity of 5,000 spectators.

The club is founded after the merging of Rakovski and FK-13 (both Sofia clubs) in 1947. In the same year they are merged with FC Yunak.  It existed independently until 22 January 1969, when it was merged with Levski Sofia.  The name of the newfound club was Levski Spartak.  After 1990 the club's independence has been restored. In 2005 the name was changed to "Levski-Spartak", when Levski Sofia has become his parent club.

The team won the Bulgarian Cup in 1968 and came second in the Bulgarian Championship in 1951 and 1952.

Honours

Domestic
Bulgarian Cup:
 Winners: 1968
 Runners-up (2): 1952,1967
Bulgarian A PFG:
 Runners-up (2): 1951, 1952
 Third place in the "A" group: 1947

European
Balkans Cup
 Runners-up : 1967–68

Association football clubs established in 1947
Football clubs in Sofia
1947 establishments in Bulgaria